Prison Oval is a multi-use stadium in Spanish Town, Jamaica, currently used mostly for football matches. It serves as the home ground of Rivoli United FC. The stadium holds 2,000 people.

The name 'Prison Oval' is attributed to it being on the same property as the maximum security Saint Catherine Prison. Some prisoners are able to watch matches and other events from their cells.

It is featured in the Barrington Levy song "Prison Oval Rock".

External links
Aerial view

References

Football venues in Jamaica
Buildings and structures in Saint Catherine Parish
Spanish Town